WASP-1 is a metal-rich magnitude 12 star located about  light-years away in the Andromeda constellation.

Planetary system
In 2006, an extrasolar planet was discovered by the Wide Angle Search for Planets team using the transit method. The planet has a density of 0.31 to 0.40 g/cm3, making it about half as dense as Saturn, and one third as dense as water. The  orbit of WASP-1b is inclined to rotational axis of the star by 79.0 degrees, making it a nearly "polar" orbit.

Two searches for additional planets using transit-timing variations have yielded negative results.

See also
 SuperWASP
 List of extrasolar planets

References

External links
 
 Image WASP 1

Andromeda (constellation)
F-type main-sequence stars
Planetary transit variables
Planetary systems with one confirmed planet
1
J00204007+3159239